The 2013–14 Boise State Broncos men's basketball team represented Boise State University during the 2013–14 NCAA Division I men's basketball season. The Broncos, led by fourth year head coach Leon Rice, played their home games at Taco Bell Arena and were a member of the Mountain West Conference. They finished the season 21–13, 9–9 in Mountain West play to finish in a tie for fifth place. They advanced to the semifinals of the Mountain West Conference tournament where they lost to New Mexico. Despite having 21 wins, after not being invited to the NIT, the Broncos, citing injuries, chose not to accept an invitation to the CBI or CIT.

Taco Bell Arena had a new court design for this season

Departures

Recruiting

Roster

Schedule

|-
!colspan=9 style="background:#143D99; color:#FF6600;"| Exhibition

|-
!colspan=9 style="background:#143D99; color:#FF6600;"| Regular season

|-
!colspan=9 style="background:#143D99; color:#FF6600;"| Mountain West tournament

References

Boise State Broncos men's basketball seasons
Boise State
Boise
Boise